The Catholic Common Ground Initiative is an intra-ecclesial relations effort launched in 1996 by the National Pastoral Life Center. Its original goal was to dialogue with dissenting Catholics on a variety of unresolved issues that came about in the years following the Second Vatican Council. One of its most notable proponents was the late Cardinal Joseph Bernardin of Chicago.

This initiative was met with strong opposition from leading bishops in the United States. Cardinals William Wakefield Baum, James Aloysius Hickey, and Bernard Francis Law were especially opposed to any undesirable concessions regarding Catholic teachings on moral theology. The New Oxford Review was also opposed to it.

Its current purpose and central mission is "to promote dialogue within the Church on a variety of theological and social issues, including the changing roles of women, human sexuality, healthcare reform, and immigration—challenges facing not just the American Catholic Church but the United States as a whole." Since 2009, the CCGI has been a pivotal component of The Bernardin Center for Theology and Ministry, housed at Catholic Theological Union in Chicago.

National Pastoral Life Center
The National Pastoral Life Center was an organization whose goal was to serve the leadership of the Catholic Church's pastoral ministry, particularly in parishes and diocesan offices. It was founded in 1983 by Rev. Msgr. Philip J. Murnion with the help of the National Conference of Catholic Bishops. It was the publisher of Church magazine.

In 1996, the NPLC created a debate in the Church by proposing the Catholic Common Ground Initiative, whose goal was dialogue with dissenting Catholics on a variety of unresolved issues that came about in the years following the Second Vatican Council. This initiative was met with strong opposition from leading bishops in the United States. 

In November 2009, it was announced that the NPLC was closing down after 25 years of service to the Catholic Church in the United States.

See also

 Spirit of Vatican II

References

External links
Catholic Common Ground Initiative
Bernardin Center for Theology and Ministry

Catholic Church in the United States
Catholic theology and doctrine